Izharul Islam Chowdhury is the founder of Jamiatul Uloom Al-Islamia Lalkhan Bazar. He is the present executive president of Nizam-e-Islam Party and Nayeb-e-Ameer of Hefazat-e-Islam Bangladesh.

Biography
Izharul Islam Chowdhury studied at Al-Jamiatul Ahlia Darul Ulum Moinul Islam and Al-Jamiah Al-Islamiah Patiya. At present he serves as the director of his madrasa Jamiatul Uloom Al-Islamia Lalkhan Bazar.

Works
 Hayat-e Mufti-e Azam (Biography of Muhammad Faizullah) in Urdu
 Fathul Maraam sharhe faizul kalam

See also 
 Shah Ahmad Shafi
 Muhammad Faizullah
 Abdur Rahman (Islamic scholar)
 Mizanur Rahman Sayed
 Fazlul Hoque Amini
 Junaid Babunagari

References

External links 
 Bangladesh Qawmi Madrasah Education Board
 Official Website of Darul Uloom Muinul Islam Hathazari 
 A Presentation by the leaders of Hefazot-e-Islam Bangladesh

Bangladeshi Sunni Muslim scholars of Islam
Bengali Muslim scholars of Islam
Darul Uloom Hathazari Alumni
Deobandis
Living people
Year of birth missing (living people)
20th-century Muslim scholars of Islam
21st-century Bengalis